Lioponera is a genus of ants in the subfamily Dorylinae containing approximately 74 described species. The genus is distributed widely across the Afrotropical, Australasia, Indomalaya, Malagasy, and Palearctic bioregions. Lioponera was described by Mayr (1879) and later placed as a junior synonym of Cerapachys by Brown (1975).  Lioponera was resurrected as a valid genus by Borowiec (2016) during redescription of the doryline genera.

Species

Lioponera costatus 
Lioponera aberrans 
Lioponera adama 
Lioponera augustae 
Lioponera anokha 
Lioponera bakeri 
Lioponera bicolor 
Lioponera binodis 
Lioponera bispinata 
Lioponera braunsi 
Lioponera braytoni 
Lioponera brevicollis 
Lioponera brevis 
Lioponera clara 
Lioponera clarki 
Lioponera cohici 
Lioponera collingwoodi 
Lioponera constricta 
Lioponera coxalis 
Lioponera crassa 
Lioponera daikoku 
Lioponera decorsei 
Lioponera desertorum 
Lioponera dumbletoni 
Lioponera elegans 
Lioponera emeryi 
Lioponera fervida 
Lioponera ficosa 
Lioponera flammea 
Lioponera foreli 
Lioponera gilesi 
Lioponera grandis 
Lioponera greavesi 
Lioponera gwynethae 
Lioponera heros 
Lioponera hewitti 
Lioponera huode 
Lioponera inconspicua 
Lioponera iovis 
Lioponera kraepelinii 
Lioponera krombeini 
Lioponera larvata 
Lioponera longitarsus 
Lioponera luzuriagae 
Lioponera macrops 
Lioponera marginata 
Lioponera mayri 
Lioponera mjoebergi 
Lioponera mullewana 
Lioponera nayana 
Lioponera neocaledonica 
Lioponera nigra 
Lioponera nigriventris 
Lioponera nkomoensis 
Lioponera noctambula 
Lioponera parva 
Lioponera picipes 
Lioponera picta 
Lioponera piliventris 
Lioponera potteri 
Lioponera pruinosa 
Lioponera pubescens 
Lioponera punctatissima 
Lioponera reticulata 
Lioponera ruficornis 
Lioponera rugulinodis 
Lioponera senescens 
Lioponera similis 
Lioponera simmonsae 
Lioponera singaporensis 
Lioponera singularis 
Lioponera sjostedti 
Lioponera suscitata 
Lioponera turneri 
Lioponera varians 
Lioponera versicolor 
Lioponera vespula

References

Dorylinae
Ant genera